David Robert Michael Melding  (born 28 August 1962) is a former Welsh Conservative Party politician, who served as a Member of the Senedd (MS) for South Wales Central between 1999 and 2021. He was the Deputy Presiding Officer of the Senedd between 2011 and 2016.

Early life
Melding was born in Neath, where he attended Dwr-y-Felin Comprehensive School.

He read Politics at the University of Wales, Cardiff, obtaining a BSc (Econ), followed by an MA in Government at the College of William and Mary, Virginia in the United States.

Early career
Melding began his career as part of the Conservative Research Department from 1986 until 1989. 

In 1989 he became Deputy Director of the Welsh Centre for International Affairs until 1996. From 1996 to 1999, he was a coordinator at the Carers National Association in Wales.

Political career
Melding was elected to the Senedd in the South Wales Central Region in 1999, a position he held until 2021.

He has long served as the Welsh Conservatives' Director of Policy, writing manifestos for the 2003, 2007 and 2011 assembly elections.

He served as Deputy Presiding Officer of the Senedd between 2011 and 2016.

In 2016 he was mentioned as a likely name to seek the role of Presiding Officer to succeed the outgoing Rosemary Butler, but in May he confirmed we would not be standing.

Melding takes an interest in Welsh constitutional matters, and in 2017 proposed the establishment of a "second chamber of the assembly... for residents to influence decisions and laws". Such a chamber would be formed on the basis of citizens service.

That same year, he was awarded a CBE for his "services to political and public life" in the New Years Honours List.

In July 2018 he supported Paul Davies in his campaign to become the Welsh Conservatives' new leader.

In August 2019 Melding wrote in the Daily Express stating that the Conservative Party was under "severe threat" and "about to split".

In September 2019 Melding spoke out against his party's position on a no-deal Brexit, stating that he "wanted no part in a no-deal Brexit strategy that would hurt the most vulnerable."

He quit his role in the shadow front bench in September 2020 after disagreements with the party over changes to the Brexit agreements and the UK Internal Market Bill that was brought forward in the UK Parliament on the same day. He made his decision of leaving the front bench permanently after "misgivings for some time" over the party's approach to Brexit, citing that it will lead to the union breaking up.

Senedd positions 
While serving in the Senedd, Melding has been appointed to a number of Committee and Shadow Cabinet roles:

 Chair of the Standards of Conduct Committee in the First Assembly (1999-03)
 Chair of the Legislation Committee in the Second Assembly (2003–07)
 Chair of Audit Committee in the Third Assembly (2007–2011)
 Shadow Minister for Economic Development (2007–2015)
 Shadow Cabinet Secretary for Housing, Heritage, Culture, and Media (2016–2020)
 Shadow Counsel General & Shadow Minister for Culture & Communications (July 2020 – September 2020)

Personal life 
In his spare time, Melding is Governor of Meadowbank Special School in Cardiff and Headlands Special School in Penarth.

In February 2018 he spoke to the BBC about his experiences of "horribly debilitating" panic attacks, during a debate on mental health in the Senedd.

References

External links
Assembly Member profile
2007 Assembly Member biography (archived) 
Welsh Conservatives profile

Offices held

1962 births
Living people
Alumni of Cardiff University
College of William & Mary alumni
Commanders of the Order of the British Empire
Conservative Party members of the Senedd
Wales AMs 1999–2003
Wales AMs 2003–2007
Wales AMs 2007–2011
Wales AMs 2011–2016
People educated at Dwr-y-Felin Comprehensive School